The Specialty Society Relative Value Scale Update Committee or Relative Value Update Committee (RUC, pronounced "ruck") is a volunteer group of 31 physicians who have made highly influential recommendations on how to value a physician's work when computing health care prices in the United States' public health insurance program Medicare.

Background

Before the 1992 implementation of the Medicare fee schedule, physician payments were made under the "usual, customary and reasonable" payment model (a "charge-based" payment system). Physician services were largely considered to be misvalued under this system, with evaluation and management services being undervalued and procedures overvalued. Third-party payers (public and private health insurance) advocated an improved model to replace the UCR fees, which had been associated with stark examples of specialists making significantly higher sums of money than primary care physicians.

With reference to the research of William Hsiao and colleagues, the Omnibus Budget Reconciliation Act of 1989 was passed with the legislative intent of reducing the payment disparity between primary care and other specialties through use of the resource-based relative value scale (RBRVS). Beginning in 2000, all three components of the Medicare RBRVS, physician work, practice expense and malpractice expense are resource-based as required by Section 1848(c) of the Social Security Act.

Workings

RUC was established in 1991 by the American Medical Association (AMA) and medical specialist groups. The AMA sponsors RUC "both as an exercise of 'its First Amendment rights to petition the Federal Government' and for 'monitoring economic trends ... related to the CPT [Current Procedures and Terminology] development process".

RUC is highly influential because it de facto sets Medicare valuations of physician work relative value units (RVUs) of Current Procedural Terminology (CPT) codes. (The Centers for Medicare and Medicaid Services (CMS) is the de jure work RVU determining body.) On average, physician work RVUs make up slightly more than half of the value in a Medicare payment. Historically, CMS has accepted RUC recommendations more than 90% of the time. Health economist Uwe Reinhardt characterized the CMS as slavishly accepting RUC recommendations. The physician work RVU values accepted by CMS also influence private health insurance reimbursement.

In 2002, a RUC update of values raised concerns that the process, which was initiated by medical speciality groups, unfairly cut primary care physician pay.

In a 2010 Archives of Internal Medicine publication written before the major health care reform legislation passed Congress—the Patient Protection and Affordable Care Act (PPACA)—Federman et al. wrote:

Critics have pointed out that many RUC members may have significant conflicts of interest because of their financial relationships.

In 2013 a report in the Washington Post highlighted how time seemed to bend in the system of time values assigned to various procedures. A Florida practice performing an average twelve colonoscopies and four other procedures a day in 2012 would be considered to take the physically impossible 26 hours in a nine- to 10-hour day. In other examples: In Florida and Pennsylvania surgery centers in some specialties, "more than one in five doctors would have to have been working more than 12 hours on average on a single day — much longer than the 10 hours or so a typical surgery center is open"; and "Florida records show 78 doctors — gastroenterologists, ophthalmologists, orthopedic surgeons and others — who performed at least 24 hours worth of procedures on an average workday". RUC chairperson Levy said in the report, "None of us believe the numbers are fine-tuned.... We do believe we get them right with respect to each other" while emphasizing that the "voting people around that table can be really harsh". Researcher Hsiao of the original Harvard study said the "current set of values 'seems to be distorted.... The AMA fought very hard to take over this updating process. I said this had to be done by an impartial group of people. This is highly political'". Looking at the time between 2003 and 2013, "the AMA and Medicare have increased the work values for 68 percent of the 5,700 codes analyzed by The Post, while decreasing them for only 10 percent" and while technology is argued, again with colonoscopies as an example, to be reducing actual time spent. Looked at another way, "Medicare spending on physician fees per patient grew 58 percent between 2001 and 2011, mostly because doctors increased the number of procedures performed but also because the price of those procedures rose". Finally, there was an indication in the report that the acceptance rate of the AMA's values by Medicare "has fallen in recent years from 90 percent [or higher] to about 70 percent" but the federal agency has far fewer people – "six to eight" – monitoring the process than the AMA has operating it.

The RUC bears the brunt of the inherent problems with regulation and government price-setting. In a follow-up to The Washington Post report, Bloomberg notes: "There is no system of payment-setting that will not ultimately rely on information from self-interested parties, just as there is no system of financial regulation that can be designed without talking to bankers, or a system of education reform that can be put in place without asking teachers and principals how things work now."

The Independent Payment Advisory Board passed in the PPACA. It could bypass RUC to cut payments to relatively highly compensated specialists, such as dermatologists.

Membership
The current membership of the Relative Value Scale Update Committee (RUC) is as follows:

 RUC Chairperson – Peter K. Smith, MD
 American Medical Association – Michael D. Bishop, MD
 CPT Editorial Panel – Kathy Krol, MD
 Health Care Professional Advisory Committee – Dee Adams Nikjeh, PhD, CCC-SLP
 Practice Expense Subcommittee – Scott Manaker, MD
 American Academy of Dermatology – Scott Collins, MD
 American Academy of Family Physicians – Walt Larimore, MD
 American Academy of Neurology – Marc Raphaelson, MD
 American Academy of Ophthalmology – George Williams, MD
 American Academy of Orthopaedic Surgeons – Dale Blasier, MD
 American Academy of Otolaryngology–Head and Neck Surgery – Bradley Marple, MD
 American Academy of Pediatrics – Margie Andreae, MD
 American Association of Neurological Surgeons – Gregory Przybylski, MD
American College of Allergy, Ashma & Immunology: Alnoor Malick, MD
 American College of Cardiology – James Blankenship, MD
 American College of Emergency Physicians – Jennifer L. Wiler, MD
American College of Obstetricians and Gynecologists – Gregory DeMeo, MD
 American College of Physicians – M. Douglas Leahy, MD
 American College of Radiology – Ezequiel Silva, MD
 American College of Surgeons – Christopher Senkowski, MD, FACS
 American Geriatrics Society – Alan Lazaroff, MD
 American Osteopathic Association – David F. Hitzeman, DO
 American Psychiatric Association – Allan Anderson, MD
 American Society of Anesthesiologists – Stanley Stead, MD
 American Society of Clinical Oncology – David Regan, MD
 American Society of Plastic Surgeons – James C. Waldorf, MD
 American Urological Association – Norman Smith, MD
 College of American Pathologists – Jimmy Clark, MD
Infectious Diseases Society of America: Daniel McQuillen, MD
 Primary Care Rotating Seat – Jennifer Aloff, MD
Society of Thoracic Surgeons –Verdi DiSesa, MD

References

Further reading

External links
Laugesen, M.J., R. Wada & E.M Chen "In Setting Doctors’ Medicare Fees, CMS Almost Always Accepts The Relative Value Update Panel’s Advice On Work Values"  Health Affairs May 2012  
Is it time to declare independence from the RUC? from Texas family docs blog

Replace the RUC!
A Legal Challenge To CMS’ Reliance On The RUC
Rethinking The Value Of Medical Services

Warner, Gregory, (June 11, 2012) "The world of health-care pricing"; originally "The secret world of health care pricing", Marketplace. The relationship between the American Medical Association (via the RUC) and Medicare and "how it determines the cost of health care". The report's headline was amended; a response from the AMA was posted; and a statement from the committee's chair, Dr. Barbara Levy, was played on air June 19, 2012. The Marketplace website posted a link to "Replace the RUC" Blog.

American Medical Association
Health economics
Medicare and Medicaid (United States)
Healthcare reform advocacy groups in the United States
Organizations established in 1991
1991 establishments in the United States